Curumin (born Luciano Nakata Albuquerque July 28, 1976, in São Paulo, Brazil) is a Brazilian musician whose style incorporates elements of samba, funk, jazz, bossa nova, and hip hop. He sings in Portuguese and speaks fluent English. His first album, Achados E Perdidos, was released on September 20, 2005, on the Quannum Projects label.

Curumin and Quannum Projects first crossed paths when Chief Xcel, one half of Blackalicious and one fifth of Quannum, was on tour in Brazil. Happening upon Achados E Perdidos while in São Paulo, Xcel knew immediately that this was a record that could resonate with audiences outside Brazil as well.

In 2011 he contributed the song "Ela (Ticklah Remix)" to the Red Hot Organization's most recent charitable album Red Hot + Rio 2. The album is a follow-up to the 1996 Red Hot + Rio, proceeds from the sales being donated to raise awareness and money to fight AIDS/HIV and related health and social issues.

In 2017 his album Boca was nominated for the 2017 Latin Grammy Award for Best Portuguese Language Rock or Alternative Album.

Discography 
Studio albums
 Perro (2005, The Projects)
 Achados e Perdidos (2005, YB Music, Quannum Projects)
 JapanPopShow (2008, YB Music, Quannum Projects)
 Arrocha (2012, YB Music, Quannum Projects)
 Boca (2017, Natura Musical, Brasuca Produções)

Other album appearances
 Live at KXLP Vol. 5 –  "Extendo" (2009)

References

1976 births
Living people
Brazilian drummers
Brazilian singer-songwriters
Samba musicians
Brazilian funk singers
21st-century Brazilian singers
21st-century drummers
Six Degrees Records artists
Anti- (record label) artists